Harpa articularis, common name the articulate harp shell, is a species of sea snail, a marine gastropod mollusk in the family Harpidae, the harp snails.

Description
The size of the shell varies between 50 mm and 110 mm.

The rather thin shell is ovate and ventricose. The spire is conical, indistinctly muricated.  The ribs are pretty narrow, distant and slightly flattened. They are marked by transverse brown lines, articulated and winding like light festoons. Between these lines appear white and violet spots. The interstices between the ribs are grayish. The longitudinal waved lines which are there seen, are strongly arched, and very contiguous to each other. They form species of transverse bands, at the origin of which exists a triangular brown chestnut-colored spot. The sharpest angle of this spot is continued sometimes into the interstices, in the middle of the narrow and white bands formed by the bars to the number of twelve upon the body whorl. The brown bars are less conspicuous. The large aperture is ovate, of a violet color upon the edge, and reddish within. Through these colors are perceived the transverse brown bands. The columella is polished, covered over its whole length by a large brown chestnut-colored spot.

Distribution
This species occurs in the Indian Ocean off the Mascarene Basin to the West Pacific, as far as Fiji; also off Australia (Northern Territory, Queensland, Western Australia)

References

 Lamarck, J.B.P.A. de M. 1822. Histoire naturelle des Animaux sans Vertèbres. Paris : J.B. Lamarck Vol. 7 711 pp.
 Habe, T. 1964. Shells of the Western Pacific in color. Osaka : Hoikusha Vol. 2 233 pp., 66 pls. 
 Rehder H.A. (1973). The family Harpidae of the world. Indo-Pacific Mollusca 3(16) : 207–274.
 Tantanasiriwong, R. 1978. An illustrated checklist of marine shelled gastropods from Phuket Island, adjacent mainland and offshore islands, Western Peninsula, Thailand. Phuket Marine Biological Center, Research Bulletin 21: 1-22, 259 figs
 Walls, J.G. (1980). Conchs, tibias and harps. A survey of the molluscan families Strombidae and Harpidae. T.F.H. Publications Ltd, Hong Kong
 Springsteen, F.J. & Leobrera, F.M. 1986. Shells of the Philippines. Manila : Carfel Seashell Museum 377 pp., 100 pls. 
 Wilson, B. 1994. Australian Marine Shells. Prosobranch Gastropods. Kallaroo, WA : Odyssey Publishing Vol. 2 370 pp.
 Dance, S.P. & G.T. Poppe, 1999 Family Harpidae. In : A Conchological Iconography (ConchBooks, ed.), 69 p.

External links
 
 

Harpidae
Gastropods described in 1822
Taxa named by Jean-Baptiste Lamarck